Chwałkowice may refer to the following places in Poland:
Chwałkowice, Lower Silesian Voivodeship (south-west Poland)
Chwałkowice, Greater Poland Voivodeship (west-central Poland)